Daniel Joseph Mengden (born February 19, 1993) is an American professional baseball pitcher who is a free agent. He has played in Major League Baseball (MLB) for the Oakland Athletics and Kansas City Royals, and in the KBO League for the Kia Tigers.

College career
After graduating from Westside High School in Houston, Texas, Mengden played college baseball at Texas A&M University from 2012 to 2014. During his three years, he appeared in 54 games with 36 starts. He went 15–17 with a 3.21 earned run average (ERA) and 230 strikeouts.

Professional career

Houston Astros
Mengden was drafted by the Houston Astros in the fourth round of the 2014 MLB draft. He made his professional debut with the Gulf Coast Astros and was later promoted to the Tri-City ValleyCats.

In 2015, he started the season with the Quad Cities River Bandits and was promoted to the Lancaster JetHawks after recording a 1.16 ERA.

Oakland Athletics
Prior to the 2015 trade deadline, the Astros traded Mengden and Jacob Nottingham to the Oakland Athletics for Scott Kazmir.

In 2016, he began the season with the Double-A Midland RockHounds, but was promoted to the Triple-A Nashville Sounds on May 1. With Nashville, he had a 3–1 record with a 1.39 ERA in seven starts. On June 11, 2016, he made his MLB debut, against the Cincinnati Reds. He won his first MLB game in the Battle of the Bay against the San Francisco Giants on June 27, 2016.

He'd remain in the rotation for the remainder of the 2016 season, finishing with 14 starts for the A's. Mengden recorded 2 wins and 9 losses with 71 K's in 72 innings. In 2017, Mengden spent the majority of the season in the minors, only pitching 7 starts for Oakland. In 2018, he was 7-6 with an ERA of 4.05 in 22 games (17 starts).

In 2019, he did not replicate his success as he had done the previous season, going 5-2 with an ERA of 4.83 in 13 games (9 starts).

During the off-season, Mengden underwent two intestinal surgeries and an arthroscopic elbow surgery. On September 20, 2020, Mengden was designated for assignment by the Athletics. On October 9, 2020, Mengden elected free agency.

While playing for the A's he was noted for his Rollie Fingers style handlebar mustache.

Kia Tigers
On December 25, 2020, Mengden signed a one-year, $425K contract with the Kia Tigers of the KBO League.  He became a free agent following the season.

Kansas City Royals
On March 8, 2022, Mengden signed a minor league deal with the Kansas City Royals. Mengden was selected to the 40-man roster on June 13 after Joel Payamps was placed on the COVID-19 injured list. He was outrighted on July 2, 2022. Mengden was designated for assignment on September 2. He elected free agency on October 6, 2022.

Personal life
Daniel is the oldest son of Beth and Joe Mengden, and has four siblings: an older sister, Victoria; and three younger siblings, twins Michael and Rachel; and Gabrielle. Mengden was home schooled through eighth grade, at which time his parents ultimately decided to place him in public high school in order to further his baseball career. Victoria is a highschool math teacher and his younger siblings are professional dancers; Michael with the Cincinnati Ballet and Gabrielle with Oklahoma City Ballet. Daniel married Danielle Bishop on November 7, 2020 in Houston, Texas.

References

External links

Texas A&M Aggies bio

1993 births
Living people
Baseball players from Houston
American expatriate baseball players in South Korea
Gulf Coast Astros players
Kansas City Royals players
Kia Tigers players
Lancaster Barnstormers players
Las Vegas Aviators players
Major League Baseball pitchers
Midland RockHounds players
Nashville Sounds players
Oakland Athletics players
Quad City River Bandits players
Stockton Ports players
Texas A&M Aggies baseball players
Tri-City ValleyCats players
United States national baseball team players